The 2011 Damallsvenskan was the 39th edition of the premier women's football championship in Sweden, and the 24th season of the Damallsvenskan era. Contested by twelve teams, it ran from 9 April to 15 October 2011. Defending champion LdB FC Malmö won its sixth title with a one-point advantage over Kopparbergs/Göteborg FC, which also repeated as the runner-up, qualifying too for the 2012–13 UEFA Women's Champions League. Umeå IK, Tyresö FF and KIF Örebro followed in the table within a ten points distance. On the other hand, 1985 champion Hammarby IF and newly promoted Dalsjöfors GoIF were relegated as the two bottom teams. With 16 goals Malmö's Manon Melis's repeated as the season's top scorer, ex-aequo with 7th-placed Kristianstads DFF's Margrét Lára Viðarsdóttir.

Table

Results

Season statistics

Top scorers

Top assists

References

External links 

 Official website 

Damallsvenskan seasons
1
Dam
Sweden
Sweden